Marylebone Up Tunnel Sidings is a stabling point located in Marylebone, London, England. The depot is situated on the Chiltern Main Line and is on the east side of the line to the north of London Marylebone station.

The depot code is ME.

Allocation 
As of 2018, stabling is provided for Chiltern Railway  Turbos.

References

Bibliography

Railway depots in London